The canton of Quillebeuf-sur-Seine is a former canton of the Eure département, in northwestern France. It had 6,228 inhabitants (2012). It was disbanded following the French canton reorganisation which came into effect in March 2015. It consisted of 14 communes, which joined the canton of Bourg-Achard in 2015.

The canton comprised the following communes:

 Aizier
 Bouquelon
 Bourneville
 Marais-Vernier
 Quillebeuf-sur-Seine
 Saint-Aubin-sur-Quillebeuf
 Sainte-Croix sur-Aizier
 Sainte-Opportune-la-Mare
 Saint-Ouen-des-Champs
 Saint-Samson-de-la-Roque
 Saint-Thurien
 Tocqueville
 Trouville-la-Haule
 Vieux-Port

References

Quillebeuf-sur-Seine
2015 disestablishments in France
States and territories disestablished in 2015